Levent Üzümcü (born 6 July 1972) is a Turkish actor.

Biography
Levent Üzümcü studied at  Karşıyaka Aydoğdu Primary School and Eşref Paşa High School. He trained in theatre first at the Anadolu University in Eskişehir and then at the Los Angeles Acting School. From 1996, he worked at the İstanbul City Theatre. He gained national fame playing Cem Onaran on the sitcom Avrupa Yakası. Additionally, he also presented the Akıl Şampiyonu show on  TürkMax.

Üzümcü was married to psychological advisor Ebru Tuay and they have two children, named Ada and Batu.

Filmography

References

External links
Official website
 

1972 births
Living people
Actors from İzmir
Turkish male film actors
Turkish male television actors
Turkish male stage actors
Turkish socialists
Anadolu University alumni